The 1957 Brooklyn Dodgers season was overshadowed by Walter O'Malley's threat to move the Dodgers out of Brooklyn if the city did not build him a new stadium in that borough. When the best the mayor could promise was a stadium in Queens, O'Malley made good on his threats and moved the team to Los Angeles after the season ended. The Dodgers final game at Ebbets Field was on September 24 as they finished their 68th and last NL season, and their 75th overall, in Brooklyn in third place with an 84–70 record, eleven games behind the NL and World Series Champion Milwaukee Braves.

Offseason 
 October 14, 1956: Connie Grob was purchased by the Dodgers from the Washington Senators.

Regular season 
During the season, the Dodgers played eight home games at Roosevelt Stadium in Jersey City, New Jersey, as part of owner Walter O'Malley's continued attempts to pressure Brooklyn to allow him to build a new stadium in his preferred location at Flatbush and Atlantic Avenues.

On July 20, 1957: Duke Snider hit the 300th home run of his career. The opposing pitcher was Dick Drott.

Danny McDevitt was the last pitcher to pitch for the Brooklyn Dodgers in a game at Ebbets Field. The game was contested on September 24, 1957, and McDevitt pitched a complete game. He had nine strikeouts while allowing only five hits.

Season standings

Record vs. opponents

Opening Day Lineup

Notable transactions 
 April 5, 1957: Chico Fernández was traded by the Dodgers to the Philadelphia Phillies for Ron Negray, Tim Harkness, Elmer Valo, Mel Geho (minors), cash and a player to be named later. The Phillies completed the deal by sending Ben Flowers to the Dodgers on April 8.
 May 23, 1957: Don Elston was traded by the Dodgers to the Chicago Cubs for Vito Valentinetti and Jackie Collum.
 May 26, 1957: Tommy Lasorda was purchased by the Dodgers from the New York Yankees
 May 30, 1957: Jim Fridley was purchased by the Dodgers from the New York Yankees.
 June 14, 1957: Ken Lehman was purchased from the Dodgers by the Baltimore Orioles.
 June 15, 1957: Babe Birrer was purchased by the Dodgers from the Baltimore Orioles.
 August 24, 1957: Vito Valentinetti was purchased from the Dodgers by the Cleveland Indians.

Roster

Player stats

Batting

Starters by position 
Note: Pos = Position; G = Games played; AB = At bats; H = Hits; Avg. = Batting average; HR = Home runs; RBI = Runs batted in

Other batters 
Note: G = Games played; AB = At bats; H = Hits; Avg. = Batting average; HR = Home runs; RBI = Runs batted in

Pitching

Starting pitchers 
Note: G = Games pitched; IP = Innings pitched; W = Wins; L = Losses; ERA = Earned run average; SO = Strikeouts

Other pitchers 
Note: G = Games pitched; IP = Innings pitched; W = Wins; L = Losses; ERA = Earned run average; SO = Strikeouts

Relief pitchers 
Note: G = Games pitched; W = Wins; L = Losses; SV = Saves; ERA = Earned run average; SO = Strikeouts

Awards and honors 
Gold Glove Award
Gil Hodges

All-Stars 
1957 Major League Baseball All-Star Game
Gino Cimoli reserve
Gil Hodges reserve
Clem Labine reserve

Farm system 

LEAGUE CHAMPIONS: Bluefield

Notes

References 
Baseball-Reference season page
Baseball Almanac season page

External links 
1957 Brooklyn Dodgers uniform
Brooklyn Dodgers reference site
Acme Dodgers page 
Retrosheet

Los Angeles Dodgers seasons
Brooklyn Dodgers season
1957 in sports in New York City
1950s in Brooklyn
Flatbush, Brooklyn